Anthony Redmon (born April 9, 1971) is a former American football guard in the National Football League. He was drafted by the Arizona Cardinals in the fifth round of the 1994 NFL Draft. He played college football at Auburn.

Redmon also played for the Carolina Panthers, and Atlanta Falcons.

Professional career

Arizona Cardinals
Redmon was drafted by the Arizona Cardinals in the fifth round of the 1994 NFL Draft. He played for the team until 1997, starting 46 of 49 games at right guard.

Carolina Panthers
Before the 1998 season Redmon signed with Carolina Panthers. In his two years with the team he started 19 of 29 games at right guard.

Atlanta Falcons
Redmon signed with the Atlanta Falcons before the 2000 season. In his only year with the team, he made 4 starts.

1971 births
Living people
People from Brewton, Alabama
American football offensive guards
Players of American football from Alabama
Auburn Tigers football players
Arizona Cardinals players
Carolina Panthers players
Atlanta Falcons players